The Verreau Bay is a freshwater body located in the northeast part of Gouin Reservoir, in the territory of the town of La Tuque, in the administrative region of the Mauricie, in the province of Quebec, in Canada.

Toponymy 
The term "Verreau" constitutes a surname of French origin. Formerly, this body of water was designated "Lac Nemiscaioui".

The toponym "Baie Verreau" was made official on 5 December 1968 by the Commission de toponymie du Québec, i.e. when this organization was created.

References

See also 
 Saint-Maurice River, a stream
 List of lakes in Canada

Lakes of Mauricie
Gouin Reservoir